Bradford is an unincorporated community in Anderson County, located in the U.S. state of Texas. According to the Handbook of Texas, the community had a population of 30 in 2000. It is located within the Palestine, Texas micropolitan area.

History
Bradford was first settled around 1879. A post office was established at Bradford in 1882 and remained in operation until 1907. It is thought to be named for B.L. Bradford, the community's first postmaster. A Presbyterian church, a general store, and steam-powered cotton gins and gristmills were in the settlement in 1884 and had a population of 150 inhabitants. In 1896, the settlement reached its population zenith of 200 and brothers J.B. and D.D. Hanks established a sawmill and gin in the early 1900s. It began to fade soon afterward. It had 125 inhabitants in 1900, which then plunged to about 20 settlers by 1933. There was a factory, another unknown business, and an unknown number of homes scattered along the road in the 1930s. The population increased to 50 in the mid-1940s. It lost half of its population by 1949 and it only had 22 residents from 1974 to 1990. It had a business, a cemetery, and several homes in 1985. It had 30 inhabitants in 2000.  The town's only business, Bradford Cafe, formerly Walls General Store, burned to the ground on September 18, 2017.

Geography

Education
Bradford had its own school in 1884. Today the community is served by the Cayuga Independent School District.

References

Unincorporated communities in Anderson County, Texas
Unincorporated communities in Texas